Printworks is an urban entertainment venue offering a cinema, clubs and eateries, located on the corner of Withy Grove and Corporation Street in Manchester city centre, England.

Original print works
Printworks entertainment venue is located on the revamped Withy Grove site of the business premises of the 19th century newspaper proprietor Edward Hulton, established in 1873 and later expanded. Hulton's son Sir Edward Hulton expanded his father's newspaper interests and sold his publishing business based in London and Manchester to Lord Beaverbrook and Lord Rothermere when he retired in 1923. Most of the Hulton newspapers were sold again soon afterwards to the Allied Newspapers consortium formed in 1924 (renamed Kemsley Newspapers in 1943 and bought by Roy Thomson in 1959).

Earlier names of the buildings associated with publishing that were incorporated into the development include Withy Grove Printing House, the Chronicle Buildings, Allied House, Kemsley House, Thomson House and Maxwell House. Kemsley House on the corner of Withy Grove and Corporation Street was developed gradually from 1929 and became the largest newspaper printing house in Europe. The site housed a printing press until 1986. Robert Maxwell bought the property and subsequently closed it down. The building was left unused for over a decade and fell derelict.

Redevelopment
The property was subsequently redeveloped and reopened as a leisure centre as part of the redevelopment of Manchester following the 1996 IRA bombing.

In 1998 the derelict building and surrounding site were bought for £10 million by Shudehill Developments, a joint venture by Co-operative Wholesale Society and Co-operative Insurance Society which owned buildings and land adjacent to the building. The building was renamed Printworks reflecting its past history and underwent a £110 million conversion to transform the property into an entertainment venue. The frontage Pevsner describes as a "weakly Baroque Portland stone façade" was retained, and part of an internal railway from the newspaper business and its turntable for transporting newspapers was incorporated into the new floor.

In 2000, Printworks was opened by Sir Alex Ferguson and Lionel Richie as the venue for a variety of clubs, leisure facilities and eateries. The new 365,000-square-foot facility is set over four floors. The new building features a twenty-screen UCI cinema complex (subsequently bought by Odeon and, in 2017, by Vue Cinemas) which includes North West England's first IMAX screen, a Nuffield Health fitness club, a Hard Rock Cafe restaurant and Cargo nightclub. The external lighting facing Exchange Square has been changed numerous times since opening.

The iconic Manchester Printworks is currently undergoing a £20m digital refurbishment with the intention of reaffirming Printworks on the international stage as a unique all-round entertainment and leisure attraction. This will include the introduction of Europe’s largest indoor digital ceiling, with immersive interactive digital gaming and creative shows.

Ownership
The property was sold to Resolution Property for £100 million in 2008, and was sold again to Land Securities for £93.9 million in 2012.

References
Footnotes

Bibliography

External links

Printworks

IMAX venues
Tourist attractions in Manchester
Buildings and structures in Manchester
Hulton family